The Buckle Sports Coupe is a fibreglass-bodied sports car which was produced in Australia by Buckle Motors from 1957 to 1959 . The 2-door coupe used a combination of Ford Zephyr Six and Ford Zephyr Mark II components, including a straight-6 engine from the Mark II. Thanks to its fibreglass body, it had a relatively light weight of 865 kg and a top speed of 160 km/h. It also featured a box chassis frame, transverse leaf spring front suspension and a conventional Ford rear axle.

A total of twenty Buckles were produced, including two incomplete examples sold for racing purposes. Bill Buckle, the person behind the creation of the car, would however go on to a successful business venture building Goggomobil cars in Australia, the highpoint of which was the production of the Australian designed Goggomobil Dart.

Motorsport
The Buckle performed well in hillclimb events and circuit races and held many records. Sixteen of the twenty Buckles built competed in motor sport, a highlight being Dick Newell's victory in the 1963 New South Wales GT Championship.

A special Buckle (Body#93-883) was built specifically for racing purposes and was raced by Bill Buckle himself circa 1960–1961. It featured a lightweight body moulded around a tubular chassis, a Raymond Mays-developed cylinder head and three SU carburetors.

Gallery

References

Cars of Australia